MNC Channel was an Indonesian international television channel owned by MNC Media. The channel aired news and entertainment programs from Indonesia for Indonesian communities worldwide.

It was launched as "MNC The Indonesian Channel" in August 2006 and changed its name to MNC International in 2010 and MNC Channel in 2015.

In March 2020, it was replaced by OK TV.

External links 
 MNC Channels Official Site – Website

References 

Television stations in Indonesia
Mass media in Jakarta
International broadcasters
Television channels and stations established in 2006
Television channels and stations disestablished in 2020
Media Nusantara Citra